George W. Egan was a colorful and controversial political figure.  He was an attorney from Sioux Falls, South Dakota.

George Egan threatened the attempt by Robert S. Vessey to receive the Republican nomination for Governor of South Dakota in 1910.  In spite of controversy, Egan became very popular among voters.  He claimed to be the first honest man to run for governor.  Egan promised to oust Crawford and Vessey, claiming that Vessey had increased the state's debt by $600,000.  However, Egan obtained only 21,446 votes to Vessey's 26,732.

Works

References

Further reading 

 
 
 
 

Politicians from Sioux Falls, South Dakota
South Dakota Republicans
Year of birth missing
Year of death missing